In the Name of the Father is a 1993 biographical crime drama film co-written and directed by Jim Sheridan. It is based on the true story of the Guildford Four, four people falsely convicted of the 1974 Guildford pub bombings that killed four off-duty British soldiers and a civilian. The screenplay was adapted by Terry George and Jim Sheridan from the 1990 autobiography Proved Innocent: The Story of Gerry Conlon of the Guildford Four by Gerry Conlon.

The film grossed $65 million at the box office and received overwhelmingly positive reviews. It was nominated for seven Oscars at the 66th Academy Awards, including Best Actor in a Leading Role (Daniel Day-Lewis), Best Actor in a Supporting Role (Pete Postlethwaite), Best Actress in a Supporting Role (Emma Thompson), Best Director, and Best Picture.

Plot
In Belfast, Gerry Conlon is mistaken for an IRA sniper by British security forces and pursued until a riot breaks out. Gerry is sent to London by his father Giuseppe to dissuade an IRA reprisal against him. 

One evening, Gerry burgles a prostitute's flat and steals £700. While he is taking drugs in a park with his friend Paul Hill, alongside homeless Irishman Charlie Burke, an explosion in Guildford occurs, killing four off-duty soldiers plus a civilian as well as injuring many others. Returning to Belfast sometime later, Gerry is captured by the British Army and Royal Ulster Constabulary and arrested on terrorism charges.

Gerry is flown to the UK mainland, where he and his friend Paul, as well as two others are dubbed the Guildford Four are subjected to police torture as part of their interrogation. 

Gerry maintains his innocence, but signs a confession after the police threaten to kill his father, who is later arrested along with other members of the Conlon family, later dubbed the Maguire Seven. At his trial, although Gerry's defence points out numerous inconsistencies in the police investigation, he, along with the rest of the Guildford Four, is sentenced to life imprisonment.

During their time in prison Gerry and Giuseppe are approached by new inmate Joe McAndrew, who informs them that he was the real perpetrator of the bombing and had confessed this to the police. They, in order to save face, withheld this new information. 

Though Gerry warms to Joe, his opinion changes when Joe sets a hated prison guard on fire during a riot. Giuseppe later dies in custody, leaving Gerry to take over his father's campaign for justice.

Giuseppe's lawyer Gareth Peirce, who had been investigating the case on Giuseppe's behalf, discovers vital evidence related to Gerry's original alibi with a note attached that reads, "Not to be shown to the defense." Through a statement made by Charlie Burke, at a court appeal, it totally exonerates Gerry and the rest. 

The film ends with the current activities of the wrongly accused, but also that the police who investigated the case were never prosecuted for any wrongdoing. The real perpetrators of the Guildford Bombing have not been charged with the crime.

Cast

Daniel Day-Lewis as Gerard Patrick "Gerry" Conlon
Pete Postlethwaite as Patrick "Giuseppe" Conlon
Emma Thompson as Gareth Peirce
John Lynch as Paul Hill
Corin Redgrave as Inspector Robert Dixon
Beatie Edney as Carole Richardson
John Benfield as Chief PO Barker
Paterson Joseph as Benbay
Marie Jones as Sarah Conlon
Gerard McSorley as Detective Pavis
Frank Harper as Ronnie Smalls
Mark Sheppard as Patrick Joseph "Paddy" Armstrong
Don Baker as Joe McAndrew 
Tom Wilkinson as an Appeal Prosecutor

Model, now actress, Saffron Burrows made her feature film debut in the film, as Gerry Conlon's free love-interest at a commune/squat in London at the time of the bombings.

Production
To prepare for the role of Gerry Conlon, Day-Lewis lost over 50 pounds in weight. To gain an insight into Conlon's thoughts and feelings at the time, Day-Lewis also spent three days and nights in a jail cell. He was prevented from sleeping by a group of thugs, who would bang on the door every ten minutes with tin cups through the night, then was interrogated by three different teams of real Special Branch officers for nine hours. He would also insist that crew members throw cold water at him and verbally abuse him. He also kept his Belfast accent on and off set.

Day-Lewis has stated in an interview that he went through all this as "How could I understand how an innocent man could sign that confession and destroy his own life."

Reception
The film received very positive reviews from most critics. The review aggregator website Rotten Tomatoes gave the film a "Certified Fresh" score of 94% based on 49 reviews, with an average rating of 7.80/10. The site's consensus states: "Impassioned and meticulously observed, In the Name of the Father mines rousing drama from a factual miscarriage of justice, aided by scorching performances and director Jim Sheridan's humanist focus." On Metacritic, the film has a score of 84 out of 100 based on 16 reviews, indicating "universal acclaim". Audiences polled by CinemaScore gave the film an average grade of "A" on an A+ to F scale.

The film was the second highest-grossing ever in Ireland (behind Jurassic Park), and the highest-grossing Irish film, beating the record set by The Commitments in 1991, with a gross of IR£2.91 million ($4.5 million).

Year-end lists 
 2nd – James Berardinelli, ReelViews
 Top 10 (not ranked) – Dennis King, Tulsa World
 Honorable mention – Dan Craft, The Pantagraph

Accolades

Controversy
Upon its release the film proved controversial for some historical inaccuracies and for fictionalising parts of the story. Jim Sheridan was forced to defend his choices. In 2003, he stated: "I was accused of lying in In the Name of the Father, but the real lie was saying it was a film about the Guildford Four when really it was about a non-violent parent."  In the film Gerry and his father Giuseppe (in the closing credits, the name is misspelled 'Guiseppe') share a cell, but this never took place; they were usually kept in separate prisons. The courtroom scenes featuring Gareth Peirce were also heavily criticised as clearly straying from recorded events and established English legal practices since, as a solicitor and not a barrister, she would not have been able to appear in court at the time. Furthermore, Peirce did not represent Giuseppe Conlon. Investigative journalist David Pallister wrote: "The myriad absurdities in the court scenes, straight out of LA Law, are inexcusable."

Soundtrack
The soundtrack of the film includes the song "You Made Me the Thief of Your Heart" performed by Sinéad O'Connor and written by Bono, Gavin Friday, and Maurice Seezer. It also includes "Voodoo Child (Slight Return)" performed by The Jimi Hendrix Experience. However, the Bob Dylan Song "Like a Rolling Stone" was not included on the album due to licensing restrictions.

The soundtrack featured these songs:
 Bono and Gavin Friday - "In the Name of the Father" (5:42)
 The Jimi Hendrix Experience - "Voodoo Child (Slight Return)" (5:09)
 Bono and Gavin Friday - "Billy Boola" (3:45)
 The Kinks - "Dedicated Follower of Fashion" (3:00)
 Trevor Jones - "Interrogation" (7:11)
 Bob Marley and the Wailers - "Is This Love" (3:51)
 Trevor Jones - "Walking the Circle" (4:42)
 Thin Lizzy - "Whiskey in the Jar" (5:44)
 Trevor Jones - "Passage of Time" (5:52)
 Sinéad O'Connor - "You Made Me the Thief of Your Heart" (6:21)

Filming locations
South Lotts, Dublin, Ireland (used for opening Belfast scenes)
Sheriff Street, Dublin, Ireland (Sheriff Street flats complex (now demolished) used for riot scene)
Kilmainham Gaol, Dublin, Ireland (as Park Royal Prison)
Liverpool, England (used for many London scenes)

See also
Birmingham Six
List of films featuring hallucinogens

References

External links

 
 
 
 
 
 

1993 films
1990s English-language films
English-language Irish films
1990s biographical drama films
1990s prison films
British biographical drama films
British legal films
British prison drama films
Irish biographical films
Irish drama films
British courtroom films
Political drama films
Universal Pictures films
Golden Bear winners
Drama films based on actual events
Films set in Belfast
Films shot in the Republic of Ireland
Films directed by Jim Sheridan
Films about the Irish Republican Army
Films about The Troubles (Northern Ireland)
Films about lawyers
Films about miscarriage of justice
Films scored by Trevor Jones
1993 drama films
1990s British films